American Kenpo Karate, also known as Ed Parker's Kenpo Karate, American Kenpo and Kenpo Karate, is an all-inclusive martial arts system based on applying ancient martial arts methods to modern-day scenarios and using logic and practicality to survive altercations. It is often characterized by the use of quick and decisive moves delivered from the body's natural weapons, powered by rapid stance transitions, that make up the footwork in the system.

Founded and codified by Ed Parker, American Kenpo is primarily a self-defense combat system. Parker made significant modifications to Kenpo's original art, which he learned throughout his life, by introducing or changing principles, theories, and concepts of motion as well as terminology. Parker believed in tailoring Kenpo to the individual and would encourage his students to explore the unknown areas of martial arts. To his most trusted students, the founder taught a more destructive and lethal version of the techniques involving killing methods with a knife, and they continue to pass on this aspect to their most trusted students. 

Parker left behind a large following of instructors who honored his teachings by implementing many versions of American Kenpo. As Senior Grandmaster, Parker did not name a successor to his art but instead entrusted his senior students to continue his teachings in their way.

Etymology and nomenclature
 

The word Kenpo is an English transliteration of a Ryukyuan and Japanese pronunciation of Chinese characters, the origin of which is Cantonese, pronounced Ken Fat. Due to inaccuracies in Chinese history, many people need to realize that Cantonese predates Mandarin. 

Cantonese immigrants first came to Hawaii and California, bringing their martial art of Ken Fat with them when they formed Tongs (benevolent organizations) to look after each other. As a result of needing to understand Mandarin's history, most people incorrectly think the origin of Kenpo is derived from the Mandarin Chinese pronunciation Chuan Fa. Canton (Guangzhou) and Fujian were the only ports in mainland China that were active in trade with neighboring countries. So the Min languages and Cantonese were the prevalent forms of the Chinese language that spread to the surrounding nations. Mandarin, on the other hand, originated in the Mongol/Yuan Dynasty, which is why it only has four tones as compared to the more sophisticated native Chinese dialects that have ten or more tones. 

As a result of Beijing being occupied by the Mongols and the later occupation of the Manchu/Qing Dynasty, Mandarin became the standard dialect of the North. At the same time, the original Chinese of the North and Central Plains were forced into the South. Thus, Ken Fat was further refined by the Southern Chinese and spread into Fujian and Canton, where the various respective styles developed and were imported to Taiwan, Hong Kong, Ryukyu (Okinawa), Korea, Malaysia, Indonesia, Vietnam and Japan. If you look at the pronunciation of the Chinese characters in all those neighboring countries, you will find that it sounds closer to Ken Fat than to Chuan Fa.

Due to the intense hatred of the Communists for the secret societies that used Ken Fat to support the Nationalists, which began in Fujian and Canton, Mandarin was made the official standard language of China. The meaning of Ken Fat is Fist Law but denotes a Fighting Method. It was never a standalone style, but characters were added to the end of the formal name of a style. Eventually, the Fat was dropped or rarely used, and the symbol for fist was used alone at the end of a style name. For example, Wing Chun simply means Beautiful Springtime, but when adding the character Fist to the end of it lets people know it is a fighting system (Wing Chun Kuen).

History
The de facto modern history of American Kenpo began in 1933 with Thomas Miyashiro (1915-1977), who began openly teaching Kenpo Karate in 1933 in Hawaii. Mizuho Mutsu and Kamesuke Higashiona, both students of Choki Motobu, joined him. They toured Hawaii giving public demonstrations of Kenpo Karate in support of the first public Kenpo Karate Dojo in Hawaii. They were featured in numerous local newspapers, and Kenpo Karate became very popular in Hawaii. These sensei also brought books written by Mizuho Mutsu and Choki Motobu to Hawaii, which were the most detailed books on Kenpo Karate at that time. 

While they were teaching Kenpo Karate publicly, the Chee Kong Tong in Maui had been teaching Cantonese Ken Fat since the 1920s to Cantonese immigrants. Willam Chow's father, Sun Chow Hoon, immigrated from Canton and trained Ken Fat at the Tong HQ when he first arrived in Maui. He also taught his eldest son William Chow. William Chow became an enforcer for the Tong, his nickname; the Thunderbolt, comes from a common punishment for those members who break the vows of the Tongs (death by Five Thunderbolts). Those who enforce the justice of the Tongs on members who violate their vows are often nicknamed Thunderbolt.

William Chow studied multiple martial arts in Hawaii, including Danzan Ryu Jujutsu, by observing his little brother John Chow's classes and working out with him, often using his knowledge of Ken Fat to device counters to the Jujutsu techniques. Chow eventually developed his unique style of Kenpo Karate that blended his Chinese Martial Arts training with the more focused Ryukyuan Kenpo Karate methods popularized in Hawaii. It agreed with a linear and circular motion and emphasized practical fighting techniques designed to outperform the various martial arts in the melting pot of Hawaii. William Chow called his style by many different names over the years that he taught, but most refer to his method as Kenpo Karate.  Chow experimented and modified his art, adapting it to meet the needs of American students.

Ed Parker

American Kempo orginates from Ed Parker, the de jure founder of the style. Parker started his martial arts training in Judo, earning a black belt. He then studied western boxing from his father, a boxing commissioner in Hawaii, before eventually training and earning a black belt from Chow in Kenpo Karate. After Ed Parker moved to California, he cross-referenced his martial arts knowledge with Chinese martial arts masters living in California like Lau Bun, Ark Wong, Ming Lum, James Lee, Bruce Lee and many more. Parker hosted a large martial arts tournament, the Long Beach Internationals, where he popularized the martial artists and gave many legends their start, eventually founding American Kenpo. Parker founded his own Kenpo association, The International Kenpo Karate Association (IKKA) after his students started teaching his art in other countries. Al Tracy claims Chow promoted Parker to Sandan (3rd-degree black belt) in December 1961.

Parker started teaching other Hawaiian Islanders attending Brigham Young University in Provo, Utah, in 1954. By 1956, he was teaching commercially in Provo. Late in 1956, he opened a studio in Pasadena, California. He published a book about his early system in 1960. The book has a heavy Japanese influence, including linear and circular movements, "focused" techniques and jujutsu-style locks, holds, and throws. When Parker increased the Chinese arts content of his system, he began to refer to his art as Chinese Kenpo. Based on this influence, he wrote Secrets of Chinese Karate, published in 1963.

The system, which came to be known as American Kenpo, was developed by Parker as his Specific System and featured Parker's revisions of older methods to work in more modern fighting scenarios. He heavily restructured American Kenpo's forms and techniques during this period. He moved away from techniques recognizable from other arts (such as forms familiar to Hung Gar). He established a more definitive relationship between forms and the self-defense technique curriculum of American Kenpo. Parker also eschewed esoteric Eastern concepts and sought to express the art through Western scientific principles and metaphors. During this time, Parker also dropped most Asian language elements and altered traditions favouring American English. Although he was challenged numerous times by experts and masters from multiple other Martial Arts, he remained well-respected in the Martial Arts world. 

Parker continually developed his art, causing students to learn different curriculum interpretations and arrangements depending on when they studied with him. Since many instructors had gone their ways and didn't continue with Parker's updating, Kenpo today has several different versions of techniques. All versions are correct as long as it works for the individual practitioner. This set Parker apart from many traditionalists who wanted to make students into exact replicas of their instructors. American Kenpo should be tailored to fit each student by a competent instructor.

After Parker's Death

Features

Although each American Kenpo school will differ somewhat, some common elements are:
 Basic principles, concepts and theories such as "Marriage of Gravity" — settling one's body weight to increase striking force.
 Every block is a strike; every strike is a block — a block should be directed and forceful enough to injure an opponent, decreasing their ability to continue an attack. Every strike should counter an opponent's movement, reducing their ability to mount an attack.
 Point of origin — refers to moving any natural weapon from wherever it originates rather than cocking it before deploying it. This helps to eliminate the telegraphing of moves.
 The economy of motion — choose the best available target, choose the best available weapon, and choose the best open angle, in the least amount of time to get the desired result.
 Personalization — Parker always suggested that once a student learns the lesson embodied in the "ideal phase" of the technique, they should search for some aspect that can be tailored to their needs and strengths.

Function and technique
American Kenpo emphasizes fast techniques to disable an attacker in seconds. Kicks are less common and are usually directed at the lower body because high kicks are slower to execute and potentially compromise the practitioner's balance; higher kicks are taught to more advanced and capable practitioners. American Kenpo contains a wide array of kicks, punches, open-hand, elbow and knee strikes, finger strikes, some throwing and joint locking techniques, and club and knife training. The mountain of motion and principles are available, but after learning the basics, students specialize in whatever areas fit their needs and desires. A soldier may emphasize knife techniques, a police officer may emphasize locks and stick techniques and a civilian interested in competition may emphasize the less lethal options. At the same time, some specialize in the more lethal aspects of the system.

Physically, American Kenpo develops environmental awareness, structural stability, balance, coordination, flow, speed, power and timing in that order as the student progresses through a step-by-step curriculum. Memorization of the system is optional to gain functional skills and is primarily for students who wish to become instructors. All American Kenpo students are taught how to execute each basic movement in the system and when and why to execute each basic movement. Senior Grand Master Ed Parker emphasized concepts and principles over sequences of motion. He did not want his students to mimic him but rather to tailor his American Kenpo system to their circumstances and needs. Thus American Kenpo is not a traditional art but a combat science designed to evolve as the practitioners' understanding improves. This also placed the burden of effectiveness on the individual practitioner. It was up to them to make their American Kenpo applications effective by correctly applying the concepts and principles to the instructor's ideal phase techniques.

Forms
At the time of his passing in December 1990, Parker had created Short Form 1, Long Form 1, Short Form 2, Long Form 2, Short Form 3, Long Form 3, Long Form 4, Long Form 5 (Surprise Attacks), Long Form 6 (Bare Hands vs Weapons), and Long Form 7 (Twin Clubs) the final form developed by Ed Parker only one year before his passing. 

Parker had created a Knife Set years before, which he discarded in the late 1980s. However, several senior black belts continue to teach this set, often referring to it as "Long Form 8".

Parker also created 154 named (ideal phase) technique sequences with 96 extensions, taught in three stages (Ideal, What-if and Formulation Phases).

Instruction
Beginners are introduced to the concepts and principles of the system taught through scripted scenarios that serve as starting points for further exploration into the presented topic. Senior Grand Master Ed Parker's approach to American Kenpo was to introduce an updated and practical science of Martial Arts tailored to the needs of the individual and in a manner that would take a practitioner from being a mere follower to an innovator.

The purpose of training in this manner is to increase physical coordination and continuity with linear and circular motion. When correctly executed, each movement leads into the next, keeping an adversary's "dimensional zones" in check, limiting their ability to retaliate. Should the adversary not react as anticipated, the skilled Kenpo practitioner can seamlessly transition into an alternative and appropriate action drawn spontaneously from the trained subconscious. In American Kenpo, you never try to select a specific technique in the middle of a sudden, violent altercation but just let your body do what the Kenpo training has already ingrained in you. 

Students are encouraged to formulate a logical sequence of action that removes the dangers of what-if scenarios, effectively turning a what-if problem into an even-if solution. Every American Kenpo black belt will have its unique and tailored style. However, Parker published minimum requirements for each belt rank instructor in his association - the IKKA - to follow. However, if a Kenpo Instructor starts his association, they can select their student's base curriculum as they see fit.

Crest

The design of the International Kenpo Karate Association crest was completed by Dave Parker, Mr Parker's brother, in 1958, as the art of American Kenpo was gaining international recognition. The crest design was meant to symbolically represent the art's modernized form while simultaneously acknowledging the roots of American Kenpo in traditional Chinese and Japanese martial arts.

Tiger Represents bravery, power, and physical strength. It is the early stage of a martial artist's training. It is essential to work on the basics (e.g., to have a good horse stance) to prepare the body for later advancement. Also, the Tiger in Chinese culture represents the celestial guardian of the West cardinal direction. The yang aspect of an individual.
Dragon Represents quintessence, fluidity, and agility, but also spiritual strength. It is the later stage of a martial artist's training. The dragon is placed above the tiger on the crest to symbolize the importance of mental and spiritual strength over physical strength. Physical strength is essential. It implies that martial artists must have a good conscience to guide their biological actions. Also, the Dragon in Chinese culture represents the celestial guardian of the East cardinal direction. The yin aspect of an individual.
Circle The circle represents continuity.
Dividing lines The lines within the circle represent the original methods of attack first learned by ancient practitioners of Chinese martial arts. They also demonstrate the pathways through which an object could travel.
Colors The colors are representations of proficiency within the art, alluding to the colored belt ranking system. The white represents the beginning stages, the black represents the expert, and the red represents professorship.
Chinese characters The writing acknowledges the art's Eastern roots. The characters on the right of the crest translate to "Law of the Fist, "Tang/Chinese Hand （唐手）" or "Empty Hand"（空手）" a.k.a. "Kenpo Karate". The characters on the left translate to "Spirit of the Dragon and the Tiger."
Shape The shape of the crest represents the structure of a house. The walls and roof are curved to keep evil from intruding. The axe at the bottom of the crest is a solemn reminder that should a martial artist tarnish the reputation of the organization, they will be "cut off" completely.

Belt rankings

American Kenpo has a graded colored belt system consisting of white, yellow, orange, purple, blue, green, 3rd-degree brown, 2nd-degree brown, 1st-degree brown and 1st through 10th-degree black. Different Kenpo organizations and schools may have other belt systems. The black belt ranks are indicated by half-inch red 'tips' up to the 4th degree, then a 5-inch 'block' for the 5th. After that, additional half-inch stripes are added up to the 9th degree. For 10th degree black belt, two 5-inch 'blocks' separated by a half-inch space are used. In some styles, an increasing number of stripes on both sides of the belt can indicate black belt ranks.

Syllabus
There are different requirements per belt depending on the school. Parker's IKKA schools stayed with the 24 techniques-per-belt syllabi, though some schools today have adopted a 16–20–24 technique syllabus as their standard. The 24 and the 16–20–24 technique syllabuses contain precisely the same techniques, but the latter groups them differently, so fewer techniques are found at lower belt levels, and there are more belt levels to be found. In addition to self-defense techniques, Parker set specific criteria for proficiency at each level. The requirements included basics categorized by stances, blocks, parries, punches, strikes, finger techniques, kicks, and foot manoeuvres, as well as the much neglected specialized moves and methods category, which includes joint dislocations, chokes, take-downs, throws and other grappling components.

Beyond proficiency, a student's character and attitude can also be analyzed as a significant consideration in the promotion to a new rank. Promotion after a 3rd-degree black belt has more to do with contributions made back to the art, such as teaching or other great works of exploration. For example, a third-degree black belt who further explores knife violence and brings that knowledge back may be promoted for his excellent contributions.

Notable practitioners 

 Ed Parker Jr.
 Elvis Presley 
 Dick Dale 
 Joe Hyams
 Mark Arnott
 Jeff Speakman
 Stephen Thompson
 Sascha Williams
 Bruce Lee
 Thomas Ian Griffith
 William Shatner

Notes

References

External links
 KenpoTech.Net—A site dedicated to the preservation of Ed Parker's American Kenpo Karate. Includes full details on techniques, forms, sets & more.

Kenpō
Martial arts in the United States
North American martial arts